Mount Kosciusko is a mountain, rising to , that comprises the central portion of the Ames Range in Marie Byrd Land, Antarctica. It was mapped by the United States Geological Survey from surveys and U.S. Navy air photos, 1959–1965, and was named by the Advisory Committee on Antarctic Names for Captain Henry M. Kosciusko, U.S. Navy, Commander of the Antarctic Support Activities group, 1965–1967.

It is connected to Mount Kauffman by Gardiner Ridge which is at one end of Brown Valley.

References

Volcanoes of Marie Byrd Land
Polygenetic shield volcanoes
Ames Range